The Kalbelia are a snake charming tribe from the Thar Desert in Rajasthan, India. The dance is an integral part of their culture and performed by men and women.

Kalbelia tribe 

Kalbelias are followers of Sage Kanifnath, who drank a bowl of poison and was blessed with control over venomous snakes and animals.

Kalbelias are divided in two main groups, the Daliwal and Mewara. The Kalbelias moved frequently from one place to another in ancient times. Their traditional occupation is catching snakes and trading snake venom. They rear snakes, dogs, hens, horses, donkeys, pigs and goats. Hence, the dance movements and the costumes of their community bear a resemblance to those of the serpents. They are also called Sapera and Jogira, Gattiwala and Poogiwara. The largest cluster of the Kalbelias is in Pali district, followed by significant other groups in Ajmer, Chittorgarh and Udaipur district. They live a nomadic life and belong to the scheduled tribes.

Traditionally, Kalbelia men carried cobras in cane baskets from door to door in villages while their women sang, danced and begged for alms. They revere the cobra and advocate the non-killing of such reptiles. In the villages, if a snake inadvertently happened to enter a home, a Kalbelia would be summoned to catch the serpent and to take it away without killing it. Kalbelias have traditionally been a fringe group in the society, living in spaces outside the village where they reside in makeshift camps called deras. The Kalbelias move their deras from one place to another in a circuitous route repeated over time. Over the generations, the Kalbelias acquired a unique understanding of the local flora and fauna, and are aware of herbal remedies for various diseases which, in turn, is an alternative source of income for them.

Since the enactment of the Wildlife Act of 1972, the Kalbelias have been pushed out of their traditional profession of snake handling. Now performing arts are a major source of income for them and these have received widespread recognition within and outside India. Opportunities for performance are sporadic, and also depend on tourism, which is season specific, so members of the community work in the fields, or graze cattle to sustain themselves.

The Kalbelias are Cultural Hindus and practise snake worship; they worship the Nāga and Manasa, and their holy day is Naga Panchami. The Kalbelias have different traditions from the majority of Hindus. The Kalbelia men wear a Apadravya. Kalbelias bury their dead, instead of cremating them (as is common with Hindus in the rest of the country). The groom has to pay the bride's father a price for the bride and the groom's father has to pay for the wedding.

Kalbelia dance 

The Kalbelia dance, performed as a celebration, is an integral part of Kalbelia culture. Their dances and songs are a matter of pride and a marker of identity for the Kalbelias, as they represent the creative adaptation of this community of snake charmers to changing socio-economic conditions and their own role in rural Rajasthani society.

The dancers are women in flowing black skirts who dance and twirl, replicating the movements of a serpent. They wear an upper body cloth called an angrakhi and a headcloth known as the odhani; the lower body cloth is called a lehenga. All these clothes are of mixed red and black hues and embroidered.

The male participants play musical instruments, such as the pungi, a woodwind instrument traditionally played to capture snakes, the dufli, been, the khanjari - a percussion instrument, morchang, khuralio and the dholak to create the rhythm on which the dancers perform. The dancers are tattooed in traditional designs and wear jewelry and garments richly embroidered with small mirrors and silver threads. As the performance progresses, the rhythm becomes faster and faster and so does the dance.

Kalbelia songs are based on stories taken from folklore and mythology and special dances are performed during Holi. The Kalbelias have a reputation for composing lyrics spontaneously and improvising songs during performances. These songs and dances are part of an oral tradition that is handed down generations and for which there are neither texts nor any training manuals. In 2010, the Kalbelia folk songs and dances of Rajasthan were declared a part of its Intangible Heritage List by the UNESCO.

See also 
 Gulabo Sapera 
 Ghoomar: Ghoomar is a traditional women's folk dance of Rajasthan, India.
 Rajasthani people
 Romani people
 Dom people
 Lom people

References

External links 
 Kalbelia: Kamla Sallu nath sapera & Party
 Jaisalmer Ayo:Gateway of the Gypsies
 About culture of Kalbelia by Suramnath Kalbelia Sapera
 Photo essay on the Kalbelias
 Kalbelia costume
 Kalbelia: Rajki-Puran Nath Sapera & Party
 "Kalbelia", World Music Central
 Kalbelia: Cobra Gypsies - full documentary
 KALBELIA FOLK MUSIC AND DANCE FROM RAJASTHAN
 Kalbelia in USA - Katrina Ji

Rajasthani culture
Folk dances of Rajasthan
Intangible Cultural Heritage of Humanity
Cultural heritage of India